The 1929 Maryland Aggies football team was an American football team that represented the University of Maryland in the Southern Conference  (SoCon) during the 1929 college football season. In their 19th season under head coach Curley Byrd, the Aggies compiled a 4–4–2 record (1–3–1 against SoCon opponents), finished 17th in the conference, and outscored their opponents by a total of 148 to 133.

Schedule

References

Maryland
Maryland Terrapins football seasons
Maryland Aggies football